Joshua Karon Lee Hall (born October 8, 2000) is an American professional basketball player for the Cape Town Tigers of the Basketball Africa League (BAL). He played for Moravian Prep in Hudson, North Carolina at the postgraduate level. A five-star recruit and former NC State commit, Hall chose to forgo college basketball and immediately enter the 2020 NBA draft.

High school career
Hall played his freshman season of high school basketball at Southern High School in Durham, North Carolina. For his next two years, he transferred to Oak Hill Academy, playing for its local team rather than its prestigious national team. Hall tried out for the national team during his junior season but did not make the team. Hall played a postgraduate season at Moravian Prep in Hudson, North Carolina, averaging 24 points and 4.4 rebounds per game and leading his team to a 34–3 record. At Moravian, he put on 15 pounds of muscle and emerged as a top player in his high school class. Hall was named the North Carolina Player of the Year by scouting service Phenom Hoops.

Recruiting
On November 18, 2019, Hall committed to play college basketball for NC State over offers from Louisville and DePaul, among others. By the end of his high school career, he was considered a five-star recruit by Rivals and a four-star recruit by 247Sports and ESPN. On April 6, 2020, Hall declared for the 2020 NBA draft while maintaining his college eligibility. On April 30, he announced that he would remain in the draft and sign an agent, forgoing college basketball.

Professional career

Oklahoma City Thunder (2020–2021)
After going undrafted in the 2020 NBA draft, Hall signed a two-way contract with the Oklahoma City Thunder On December 9, 2020. On September 12, 2021, Hall was waived by the Oklahoma City Thunder.

Raptors 905 (2021–2022)
Hall was signed to an Exhibit 10 day contract by the Toronto Raptors, and was waived to receive a contract to join the Raptors 905.

Maine Celtics (2022)
On October 24, 2022, Hall joined the Maine Celtics training camp roster. However, he did not make the opening night roster.

Grand Rapids Gold (2023)
On February 11, 2023, Hall was acquired by the Grand Rapids Gold. Hall was then later waived on March 3, 2023.

Cape Town Tigers (2023–present) 
On February 23, 2023, Hall was announced by the Cape Town Tigers of the Basketball Africa League (BAL).

Career statistics

NBA

|-
| style="text-align:left;"| 
| style="text-align:left;"| Oklahoma City
| 21 || 1 || 16.0 || .303 || .108 || .500 || 2.8 || 1.3 || .2 || .0 || 4.1
|- class="sortbottom"
| style="text-align:center;" colspan="2"| Career
| 21 || 1 || 16.0 || .303 || .108 || .500 || 2.8 || 1.3 || .2 || .0 || 4.1

References

External links

2000 births
Living people
American expatriate basketball people in Canada
American men's basketball players
Basketball players from North Carolina
Grand Rapids Gold players
Oak Hill Academy (Mouth of Wilson, Virginia) alumni
Oklahoma City Blue players
Oklahoma City Thunder players
sportspeople from Greenville, North Carolina
Raptors 905 players
Small forwards
Undrafted National Basketball Association players
Cape Town Tigers players